Wells Fargo is a large financial services company and bank. 

Wells Fargo may also refer to:

Structures 

 Wells Fargo Arena (disambiguation), several arenas
 Wells Fargo Building (disambiguation), various locations
 Wells Fargo Center (disambiguation), various locations
 Wells Fargo Pavilion, in the U.S. city of Sacramento, California
 Wells Fargo Plaza (disambiguation), various locations
 Wells Fargo Tower (disambiguation), various locations

Other uses 
Wells Fargo (1852–1998), predecessor to the modern Wells Fargo, merged with Norwest Corporation in 1998
 Tales of Wells Fargo, an American Western television series that ran from 1957 to 1962
 Wells Fargo (film), a 1937 western movie starring Joel McCrea
 Wells Fargo Championship, a golf tournament sponsored by Wells Fargo
 "Wells Fargo", a song by Buddy, JID, Johnny Venus of EarthGang, and Guapdad 4000 from Dreamville's collaborative mixtape Revenge of the Dreamers III
 Wells Fargo (band), a Zimbabwean funk-rock band from the 1970s